Luxembourg Socialist Youths (JSL) is the youth organization of the Luxembourg Socialist Workers' Party in Luxembourg. The organization is a member of International Union of Socialist Youth and Young European Socialists.

References

External links 
 JSL homepage

Youth wings of political parties in Luxembourg
Youth wings of social democratic parties
Luxembourg Socialist Workers' Party